Upper Freehold Township is a township in Monmouth County, New Jersey, United States.  As of the 2020 United States Census, the township's population was 7,273.

History 

Upper Freehold Township dates back to 1731, when it was formed from portions of Freehold Township. It was formally incorporated as a township by the Township Act of 1798 of the New Jersey Legislature on February 21, 1798. Over the years, portions of the township have been taken to form Millstone Township (February 28, 1844), Jackson Township (March 6, 1844) and Allentown (January 20, 1889). The name of the township derives from Freehold Township, which in turn is derived from the word freehold, an English legal term describing fee simple property ownership.

Geography
According to the United States Census Bureau, the township had a total area of 47.37 square miles (122.68 km2), including 46.48 square miles (120.37 km2) of land and 0.89 square miles (2.31 km2) of water (1.88%).

Unincorporated communities within the township include Arneytown, Cooleys Corner, Coxs Corner, Cream Ridge, Davis, Ellisdale, Emleys Hill, Fillmore, Hayti, Homes Mills, Hornerstown, Imlaystown, Kirbys Mills, Nelsonville, New Canton, New Sharon, Polhemustown, Prospertown, Pullentown, Red Valley, Robinsville, Sharon, Shrewsbury, Spring Mill, Walnford and Wrightsville.

The township borders Allentown, Millstone Township and Roosevelt in Monmouth County; North Hanover Township in Burlington County; East Windsor Township, Hamilton Township and Robbinsville Township in Mercer County; and Jackson Township and Plumsted Township in Ocean County.

Farming and other agricultural uses have been primary uses of land in the area since the time that the township was first formed. The township has  of land protected from development as part of a Farmland Preservation Program. Voters were the first in the county to approve a dedicated portion of property taxes to fund farmland preservation, which was increased by a 2001 referendum to four cents per $100 of assessed value, split between farmland preservation and the costs associated with purchasing and developing land for recreational uses.

Demographics

Census 2010

The Census Bureau's 2006–2010 American Community Survey showed that (in 2010 inflation-adjusted dollars) median household income was $122,525 (with a margin of error of +/− $16,693) and the median family income was $126,849 (+/− $10,754). Males had a median income of $100,583 (+/− $18,963) versus $65,183 (+/− $5,414) for females. The per capita income for the borough was $48,665 (+/− $3,717). About 2.3% of families and 2.5% of the population were below the poverty line, including 3.8% of those under age 18 and 2.9% of those age 65 or over.

Census 2000

As of the 2000 United States Census there were 4,282 people, 1,437 households, and 1,198 families residing in the township.  The population density was 91.4 people per square mile (35.3/km2).  There were 1,501 housing units at an average density of 32.0 per square mile (12.4/km2).  The racial makeup of the township was 94.70% White, 1.05% African American, 0.14% Native American, 1.40% Asian, 0.84% from other races, and 1.87% from two or more races. Hispanic or Latino of any race were 3.53% of the population.

There were 1,437 households, out of which 42.7% had children under the age of 18 living with them, 74.7% were married couples living together, 5.5% had a female householder with no husband present, and 16.6% were non-families. 11.7% of all households were made up of individuals, and 5.2% had someone living alone who was 65 years of age or older. The average household size was 2.96 and the average family size was 3.24.

In the township the population was spread out, with 27.8% under the age of 18, 5.0% from 18 to 24, 32.1% from 25 to 44, 25.6% from 45 to 64, and 9.4% who were 65 years of age or older. The median age was 38 years. For every 100 females, there were 101.7 males. For every 100 females age 18 and over, there were 98.7 males.

The median income for a household in the township was $71,250, and the median income for a family was $78,334. Males had a median income of $55,987 versus $35,221 for females. The per capita income for the township was $29,387. About 4.3% of families and 4.0% of the population were below the poverty line, including 1.3% of those under age 18 and 11.6% of those age 65 or over.

Parks and recreation

The Horse Park of New Jersey was conceived by equestrian enthusiasts concerned about the dwindling amount of land dedicated to their interests and activities. The Horse Park opened in 1987 on land initially purchased by the New Jersey Department of Environmental Protection with Green Acres funds, based on the input of the state's Equine Advisory Board, and is centrally located in Monmouth County's equine-oriented countryside.

The Crosswicks Creek Greenbelt includes  of land in the township, as part of a corridor running along the Crosswicks Creek from Fort Dix in Burlington County towards the Delaware River along the border between Burlington and Mercer County, traveling through Upper Freehold Township and including Historic Walnford.

A bond ordinance passed in 2000 provides for the development of soccer fields, baseball fields and basketball courts at the Byron Johnson Recreation Area and other township parks. The Byron Johnson site adjoins Allentown High School near the Allentown border, and is owned by Monmouth County and administered by the township, developed using municipal funds and monies contributed by developers.

Government

Local government
Upper Freehold Township is governed under the Township form of New Jersey municipal government, one of 141 municipalities (of the 564) statewide that use this form, the second-most commonly used form of government in the state. The Township Committee is comprised of five members, who are elected directly by the voters at-large in partisan elections to serve three-year terms of office on a staggered basis, with either one or two seats coming up for election each year as part of the November general election in a three-year cycle. At an annual reorganization meeting, the Township Committee selects one of its members to serve as Mayor and another as Deputy Mayor.

, members of the Upper Freehold Township Committee are Mayor LoriSue H. Mount (R, term on committee and as mayor ends December 31, 2022), Deputy Mayor Stephen J. Alexander (R, term on committee ends 2024; term as deputy mayor ends 2022), Robert J. Faber Sr. (R, 2024), Dr. Robert A. Frascella (R, 2023) and Stanley Moslowski Jr. (R, 2022).

Federal, state, and county representation
Upper Freehold Township is located in the 3rd Congressional District and is part of New Jersey's 12th state legislative district. 

Prior to the 2011 reapportionment following the 2010 Census, Upper Freehold Township had been in the 30th state legislative district.

 

Monmouth County is governed by a Board of County Commissioners comprised of five members who are elected at-large to serve three year terms of office on a staggered basis, with either one or two seats up for election each year as part of the November general election. At an annual reorganization meeting held in the beginning of January, the board selects one of its members to serve as Director and another as Deputy Director. , Monmouth County's Commissioners are
Commissioner Director Thomas A. Arnone (R, Neptune City, term as commissioner and as director ends December 31, 2022), 
Commissioner Deputy Director Susan M. Kiley (R, Hazlet Township, term as commissioner ends December 31, 2024; term as deputy commissioner director ends 2022),
Lillian G. Burry (R, Colts Neck Township, 2023),
Nick DiRocco (R, Wall Township, 2022), and 
Ross F. Licitra (R, Marlboro Township, 2023). 
Constitutional officers elected on a countywide basis are
County clerk Christine Giordano Hanlon (R, 2025; Ocean Township), 
Sheriff Shaun Golden (R, 2022; Howell Township) and 
Surrogate Rosemarie D. Peters (R, 2026; Middletown Township).

Politics

As of March 23, 2011, there were a total of 4,686 registered voters in Upper Freehold Township, of which 722 (15.4%) were registered as Democrats, 2,218 (47.3%) were registered as Republicans and 1,741 (37.2%) were registered as Unaffiliated. There were 5 voters registered as Libertarians or Greens.

In the 2012 presidential election, Republican Mitt Romney received 61.9% of the vote (2,287 cast), ahead of Democrat Barack Obama with 37.1% (1,372 votes), and other candidates with 1.0% (36 votes), among the 3,723 ballots cast by the township's 4,818 registered voters (28 ballots were spoiled), for a turnout of 77.3%. In the 2008 presidential election, Republican John McCain received 60.3% of the vote (2,337 cast), ahead of Democrat Barack Obama with 37.7% (1,461 votes) and other candidates with 1.0% (40 votes), among the 3,878 ballots cast by the township's 4,893 registered voters, for a turnout of 79.3%. In the 2004 presidential election, Republican George W. Bush received 63.2% of the vote (2,153 ballots cast), outpolling Democrat John Kerry with 35.6% (1,212 votes) and other candidates with 0.7% (31 votes), among the 3,409 ballots cast by the township's 4,203 registered voters, for a turnout percentage of 81.1.

In the 2013 gubernatorial election, Republican Chris Christie received 75.4% of the vote (1,827 cast), ahead of Democrat Barbara Buono with 23.0% (558 votes), and other candidates with 1.6% (39 votes), among the 2,442 ballots cast by the township's 4,893 registered voters (18 ballots were spoiled), for a turnout of 49.9%. In the 2009 gubernatorial election, Republican Chris Christie received 69.5% of the vote (1,972 ballots cast), ahead of  Democrat Jon Corzine with 23.8% (676 votes), Independent Chris Daggett with 5.4% (153 votes) and other candidates with 0.7% (20 votes), among the 2,836 ballots cast by the township's 4,737 registered voters, yielding a 59.9% turnout.

Education

Students in public school for pre-kindergarten through twelfth grade attend the Upper Freehold Regional School District, which serves students from Allentown Borough and Upper Freehold Township.  Millstone Township sends students to the district's high school as part of a sending/receiving relationship with the Millstone Township Schools. As of the 2017–2018 school year, the district, comprised of three schools, had an enrollment of 2,300 students and 196.1 classroom teachers (on an FTE basis), for a student–teacher ratio of 11.7:1. Schools in the district (with 2017–2018 enrollment data from the National Center for Education Statistics) are 
Newell Elementary School with 513 students in pre-kindergarten through 4th grade, 
Stone Bridge Middle School with 518 students in grades 5–8 and 
Allentown High School with 1,245 students in grades 9–12. The operations of the district are overseen by a nine-member board of education, with the board's trustees elected directly by voters to serve three-year terms of office on a staggered basis, with three seats up for election each year. The nine seats are allocated to the two constituent municipalities based on population, with five assigned to Upper Freehold Township and four to Allentown.

Transportation

A  portion of the Central Jersey Expressway (Interstate 195) goes through Upper Freehold, making it an important artery for residents of the township. Exit 11 leads to the Horse Park of New Jersey. Exit 8 leads to County Route 539 (Hornerstown Road / Trenton-Forked River Road / Davis-Allentown Road) to Hightstown, or towards the Garden State Parkway south to Atlantic City. County Route 524 (called Yardville-Allentown Road / South Main Street where it enters Allentown / Stage Coach Road) heads across the township, mostly to the north of Interstate 195, from Hamilton Township in Mercer County to the east and Millstone Township to the west. County Route 526 (Walker Avenue) heads from Allentown in the east to Millstone Township in the west, paralleling Interstate 195 to the north. County Route 537 (Monmouth Road) runs for  along the township's southern borders with the Ocean County municipalities of Plumsted Township and Jackson Township.

In addition, Interstate 95 (the New Jersey Turnpike) is minutes away along I-195 in neighboring Robbinsville Township (Exit 7A) and not too far also in bordering East Windsor (Exit 8).

Points of interest

 Cream Ridge Winery
 Monmouth County Park System – Clayton Park, Crosswicks Creek Park, Historic Walnford
 Imlaystown

Notable people

People who were born in, residents of, or otherwise closely associated with Upper Freehold Township include:

 James Cox (1753–1810), member of the United States House of Representatives (from New Jersey)
 John H. Froude (born 1930), politician who served in the New Jersey General Assembly from 1972 to 1980
 Joseph Holmes (1736–1809), member of the New Jersey Legislative Council who served on the Upper Freehold Township Committee and on the county Board of Chosen Freeholders
 Gilbert Imlay (1754–1828), businessman, author and diplomat
 Elisha Lawrence (1746–1799), politician who served as Vice-President of Council from 1789 through 1792, and again in 1795
 Linda K. Meirs (1884–1972), American Red Cross and Army nurse during World War I who was one of the first six American recipients of the Florence Nightingale Medal
 Ross Scheuerman (born 1993), running back for the Hamilton Tiger-Cats of the Canadian Football League
 Chris Tomson (born 1984), drummer with the band Vampire Weekend
 Samuel G. Wright (1781–1845), politician who was elected to represent  in 1845 but died before he could take office

References

External links

 Upper Freehold Township website
 Upper Freehold Regional School District
 
 School Data for the Upper Freehold Regional School District, National Center for Education Statistics

 
1731 establishments in New Jersey
Populated places established in 1731
Township form of New Jersey government
Townships in Monmouth County, New Jersey